The Ox mansion (牛宿, pinyin: Niú Xiù) is one of the Twenty-eight mansions of the Chinese constellations.  It is one of the northern mansions of the Black Tortoise.  The primary asterism of this mansion is centered on the tail of the constellation known as Capricornus in Western astronomy.

Asterisms

References 

Chinese constellations